Thomas Randolph Bell (January 27, 1943 – December 22, 2022) was an American singer, songwriter, record producer, arranger, pianist, and composer known as one of the creators of Philadelphia soul in the 1970s. He found success as a producer and songwriter for the Delfonics, Stylistics, and Spinners. In June 2006, Bell was inducted into the Songwriters Hall of Fame. In 2016, Bell was inducted into the Musicians Hall of Fame and Museum.

Background
Thomas Randolph Bell was born in Jamaica and brought over by his Jamaican parents at the age of four based on his interview with Terry Gross.Philadelphia, PennsylvaniaBoth his father and mother were from Jamaica,  His grandparents were born in Jamaica and so too Thomas Bedward Burke, his maternal grandfather, who was born in Kingston, Jamaica.
Thom Bell was one of ten children born to Anna and Leroy Bell. Anna his mother who worked as a stenographer was also a pianist. Leroy his father who owned a fish market and a restaurant also played the accordion and Hawaiian guitar.

Career 
Bell, classically trained as a musician, sang as a teenager with Kenny Gamble, Leon Huff, and Daryl Hall (of Hall & Oates fame). Bell's first big break in soul music came with Cameo Records in Philadelphia where he worked as a session player and arranger. In 1967, he was introduced to a local group called The Delfonics, producing two singles for them on subsidiary label, Moonglow. Bell brought a mellifluous, hypnotic haut en couleur style to soul music and soon his production talents yielded several big hits for the group on the Philly Groove label, run by their manager Stan Watson. These releases included "La-La (Means I Love You)" and "Didn't I (Blow Your Mind This Time)", the latter of which was nominated for a Grammy Award in 1970.

Bell had also joined the fast-growing record production company operated by Kenny Gamble and Leon Huff in Philadelphia, working as an arranger for acts such as Jerry Butler, Archie Bell & The Drells, Jerry Bell, The O'Jays, and Dusty Springfield. He arranged some of the early big hits, including the O'Jays' "Back Stabbers", on Gamble & Huff's own record label, Philadelphia International Records, which they launched in 1971. He also joined the two in setting up a music publishing company for their songs, Mighty Three Music.

By 1971, Bell had moved on to produce another local group, The Stylistics, this time on Avco Records. By then, he had teamed up with the Philadelphia-born songwriter, Linda Creed and this partnership, along with Russell Thompkins, Jr., the lead singer of the Stylistics, generated three albums full of memorable tracks. Bell and Creed became one of the era's dominant soul songwriting teams, penning hits such as "Stop, Look, Listen (To Your Heart)", "You Are Everything", "Betcha by Golly, Wow", "Break Up to Make Up", "You Make Me Feel Brand New", and "I'm Stone in Love with You" (the latter with Anthony Bell).

In 1972, Bell agreed to produce The Spinners for Atlantic Records. The group, who had long been with Motown Records, had joined Atlantic after failing to get the attention they wanted. It was the start of a successful collaboration that lasted for seven years and eight original albums. Bell revitalized the group, producing five gold albums that included chart success with singles such as "I'll Be Around", "Could It Be I'm Falling in Love", "Games People Play", and "The Rubberband Man". In 1974, he was awarded a Grammy for Best Producer of the Year.

In 1975, Bell produced an album with Dionne Warwick called Track of the Cat, one year after he had teamed her with the Spinners on the song, "Then Came You", which topped the Billboard Hot 100 and reached #2 on the R&B chart. He also worked with acts such as Johnny Mathis (two albums), Billy Paul, Ronnie Dyson, Little Anthony & The Imperials, and New York City in the mid to late 1970s, but generally with less commercial appeal.

Subsequently, Bell had success with Deniece Williams, including her R&B #1 and Top 10 re-make of The Royalettes' "It's Gonna Take a Miracle" in 1982; James Ingram with "I Don't Have the Heart" in 1990 (Bell's second #1 pop hit); and Elton John, whose EP, The Thom Bell Sessions, featured back-up by the Spinners and produced the Top 10 hit, "Mama Can't Buy You Love", in 1979. Other artists Bell produced in the 1980s included The Temptations, Phyllis Hyman, Dee Dee Bridgwater, and he even re-united briefly with the Stylistics in 1981 on Philadelphia International's subsidiary, TSOP.

Warner Chappell Music acquired Mighty Three Music in 1990.

A December 2008 interview with Bell featured on the Philly Soul box set, Love Train, stated he would soon compose a piece for the Philadelphia Orchestra. Past Orchestra members played in MFSB, the house band who played on many Bell productions.

Bell was known for being a perfectionist in his writing and very budget conscious, demanding that session musicians play his compositions as they were written and not improvise.

Personal life 
Bell married Sylvia Bell in 1965 but they later divorced in 1984. He married the former Vanessa Joanne Wittrock in Seattle on December 29, 1985. He is survived by six children.

Bell died on December 22, 2022, at the age of 79. He died at his home in Bellingham, Washington after what was described as a "lengthy illness". No further details have been given. Bell's manager and lawyer, Michael Silver, announced his death.

Producing and songwriting 

 1965: "Pass Me By" – Hattie Winston
 1968: "La-La (Means I Love You)" – The Delfonics
 1969: "Brand New Me" - Dusty Springfield
 1970: "Didn't I (Blow Your Mind This Time)" – The Delfonics
 1971: "Hey Love" – The Delfonics
 1971: "Stop, Look, Listen (To Your Heart)" – The Stylistics
 1971: "You Are Everything" – The Stylistics
 1972: "People Make the World Go Round" – The Stylistics
 1972: "Betcha by Golly, Wow" – The Stylistics
 1972: "I'm Stone in Love with You" – The Stylistics
 1972: "I'll Be Around" – The Spinners
 1972: "Could It Be I'm Falling in Love" – The Spinners
 1973: "I'm Doing Fine Now" – New York City
 1973: "One of a Kind (Love Affair)" – The Spinners
 1973: "Ghetto Child" – The Spinners
 1973: "Break Up to Make Up" – The Stylistics
 1973: "Rockin' Roll Baby" – The Stylistics
 1974: "You Make Me Feel Brand New" – The Stylistics
 1974: "Mighty Love (Part I)" – The Spinners
 1974: "Then Came You" – The Spinners (with Dionne Warwick)
 1975: "They Just Can't Stop It the (Games People Play)" – The Spinners
 1976: "The Rubberband Man" – The Spinners
 1979: "Are You Ready for Love" – Elton John (with the Spinners)
 1979: "Mama Can't Buy You Love" – Elton John
 1980: Dee Dee Bridgewater
 1981: "Silly" – Deniece Williams
 1982: "It's Gonna Take a Miracle" – Deniece Williams
 1990: "I Don't Have the Heart" – James Ingram

References

External links 
 Exclusive Thom Bell Interview published January 2012
 Bio at soulwalking.co.uk
 2006 Interview with Terry Gross on "Fresh Air"
 An interview with Soul Express in February 2018
 
 

1943 births
2022 deaths
American musicians of Jamaican descent
Grammy Award winners
Record producers from Pennsylvania
American music arrangers
American male organists
20th-century American keyboardists
Musicians from Philadelphia
Singer-songwriters from Pennsylvania
American male pianists
21st-century American pianists
21st-century organists
20th-century American male singers
20th-century American singers
American male singer-songwriters
MFSB members
American organists